Smaranjit Chakraborty is a Bengali author and screenwriter. He writes in Bengali.

Bibliography
Adamya Sen Series (Detective Series):
1) Adamya (2015) 
2) Adamya 2 (2016)
3) Adamya 3 (2019)

Full-Length Novels:
1)  Patajharar Marshume (2007)
2)  Amader Sei Shahare (2009)
3)  Etuku Bristi (2011)
4)  Finge (2012)
5)  Pakhider Sahare Jeman (2012) 
6)  Britta(2013)
7)  Budbud (2013)
8)  Alor Gandha (2013)
9) Furaye Sudhu Chokhe (2014)
10) Palta Hawa (2014)
11) Criss-cross (2014) 
12) Omm(2015) 
13) Mom-Kagaj (2016) 
14) Doyel Sanko (2017)
15) Fanush (2018)
16) Compass (2018)
17) Himjug (2018)
18) Asampurna (2019)
19) Jonakider Bari (2019)
20) SafetyPin (2020)
21) Babui (2020)
22) Chuyanno (2022)
23) Chatim (2022)
Collection of Short Stories and Novella:
1) Unish Kurir Prem (2009)
2) Premer Unish Kuri (2017)

Juvenile Fiction:
1) Atal Joler Bandhu (2016)
2) Warren Dadur Dhadha Bakso (2017)
3) Sada Sonar Deshe (2021) 
Poem Books:
1) Debotar chilekotha (2016)
2) Neel Holud Muffler-er Kache (2018)
3) Porigondher sohor (2020)
4) Sarajiboner moto (2020)
5) Dupur belar kobita (2020)
6) Jetuku Amar Noy (2022)

Filmography

References

External links
Smaranjit Chakraborty at IMDb
Smaranjit Chakraborty at Goodreads 
Smaranjit Chakraborty interview

Bengali writers
Bengali-language writers
Writers from Kolkata
21st-century Indian poets
Bengali male poets
Living people
21st-century Indian male writers
1976 births